Admiration is a social emotion felt by observing people of competence, talent, or skill exceeding standards. Admiration facilitates social learning in groups. Admiration motivates self-improvement through learning from role-models.

Definition
Sara Algoe and Jonathan Haidt include admiration in the category of other-praising emotions, alongside awe, elevation, and gratitude. They propose that admiration is the emotion we feel towards non-moral excellence (i.e., witnessing an act of excellent skill), while elevation is the emotion we feel towards moral excellence (i.e., witnessing someone perform an act of exceeding virtue). Other authors term both these emotions as admiration, distinguishing between admiration for skill and admiration for virtue. Richard Smith categorises admiration as an other-focused assimilative emotion, leading people to aspire to be like (assimilate to) those they admire. He contrasts admiration with envy (an other-focused contrastive emotion), proposing that envy leads us to feel frustrated about the competence of others, while admiration is uplifting and motivating.

Function

Learning of skills has been so important to our evolution that we have come to feel positively about talented or skillful people, in order to approach them and copy their actions. Admiration is the emotion that facilitates learning in social groups.

Relation to attainability

Following from the view that admiration's function is learning and self-improvement, some authors have proposed that admiration will only activate when we believe improvement is possible for us, however one empirical study has suggested the opposite, that admiration is akin to passive contemplation of another's superiority, while envy is the motivating emotion which activates when a better performance is attainable to us.

Associated behaviours

Behaviours concerning the self
Witnessing admirable acts has been shown to increase motivation for self-improvement in the domain of witnessed excellence (e.g., sporting performance), but also a more general motivation to work towards achieving one's own life goals. Using fMRI, admiration has been shown to be related with higher-level cognitive processes involved in motivation (e.g., planning, pursuit of goals), but also relates to lower-level activating mechanisms, demonstrating that admiration is a physically energising emotion.

Behaviours concerning the relationship
Admiration is also associated with a tendency to praise the admired act to others, and a desire for contact and proximity with the admired.

Group-based
Admiration has also been studied in an intergroup context by Susan Fiske and her colleagues. They propose that admiration is the emotion we feel towards those social groups we perceive as competent (or high-status) and warm (friendly and cooperative) (e.g., in studies involving students in the US, an example of a group perceived as competent and warm is the British). Admiration is related to intentions to associate, cooperate with, and help members from groups that are admired.

See also

References

Social emotions
Honor
Interpersonal relationships